Raja Nabakrishna Street: An old street of Kolkata (then Calcutta), situated in the north of the city. This street of North Kolkata connects Aurobindo Sarani at Hatibagan end and Rabindra Sarani at Shobhabazar end. The street was named after Raja Nabakrishna Deb: (1733–1797). Sovabazar Rajbari, Kalikrishna Deb's Rajbari, Seth Anandaram Jaipuria College and Nat Mandir are some important establishments situated in this street. Besides The Rajbari (palaces) of Raja Nabakrishna Deb and Raja Kalikrishna Deb, Sutanuti Utsav, the foundation day of Kolkata, is held from 24 August in the Nat Mandir of Sovabazar Rajbari, organised by the Sutanuti Parishad at then Sutanuti.

History

Landmarks
 Sovabazar Rajbari
 Seth Anandaram Jaipuria College
 Kalikrishna Dev's Rajbari
 Nat Mandir

Festivals
 Durga Puja of Sovabazar Rajbari
 Sutanuti Utsav

References

See also

Streets in Kolkata